Parietochloris is a genus of green algae in the family Trebouxiaceae.

References

External links

Trebouxiophyceae genera
Trebouxiophyceae
Trebouxiales